Michael Anthony Sanders (born May 7, 1960) is an American retired professional basketball player who played primarily as a small forward. He is a former assistant coach for the Utah Jazz of the National Basketball Association (NBA). Prior to being an assistant coach for Tyrone Corbin, Sanders was the team's director of player development.

Playing career
Born in Vidalia, Louisiana, Sanders was selected by the Kansas City Kings with the 74th overall pick of the 1982 NBA draft after the close of his college career at UCLA. Over the course of 11 NBA seasons, Sanders averaged eight points and three rebounds per game. He played for the San Antonio Spurs, Phoenix Suns, Cleveland Cavaliers and Indiana Pacers during this time.

Early in his career, Sanders played parts of two seasons in the Continental Basketball Association (CBA) for the Montana Golden Nuggets and Sarasota Stingers. He averaged 23.3 points and 8.9 rebounds in 37 career games in the league, earning All-Defensive second team honors in 1983.

Coaching career
After retiring from the NBA, Sanders became a head coach of the Black Hills Gold in the IBA, the Wisconsin Blast of the IBA and the Adirondack Wildcats of the USBL.

Sanders also served as an assistant coach with the Detroit Pistons, Milwaukee Bucks and Charlotte Bobcats.

Notes

External links
College & NBA stats @ basketballreference.com
Coach profile @ NBA.com

1960 births
Living people
African-American basketball coaches
African-American basketball players
American men's basketball coaches
American men's basketball players
Asheville Altitude coaches
Basketball coaches from Louisiana
Basketball players from Louisiana
Charlotte Bobcats assistant coaches
Cleveland Cavaliers players
Continental Basketball Association coaches
Detroit Pistons assistant coaches
Indiana Pacers players
Kansas City Kings draft picks
Milwaukee Bucks assistant coaches
Montana Golden Nuggets players
Parade High School All-Americans (boys' basketball)
People from Vidalia, Louisiana
Phoenix Suns players
San Antonio Spurs players
Sarasota Stingers players
Shooting guards
UCLA Bruins men's basketball players
United States Basketball League coaches
Utah Jazz assistant coaches
21st-century African-American people
20th-century African-American sportspeople